Everett Fire Station No. 2 is a historic building located in Everett, Washington.

Description and history
Designed by Earl Morrison and Vas Stimson in the Classical Revival style, Everett Fire Station No. 2 was built in 1925 by Solie and Wahl. The two-story structure with a trapezoidal floor plan, sits on a concrete foundation and has a basement. A  hose tower projects from the south corner of the rear wall. It was listed on the National Register of Historic Places on May 2, 1990.  the building is used as a training facility by the Everett City Fire Department.

See also
 History of firefighting
 Historic preservation
 National Register of Historic Places listings in Snohomish County, Washington

References

External links 
 * 

Fire stations on the National Register of Historic Places in Washington (state)
Neoclassical architecture in Washington (state)
National Register of Historic Places in Everett, Washington